Conejos is the Spanish term for "rabbits". It may refer to:
Conejos River
Conejos, Colorado
Conejos County, Colorado

See also
Conejo (disambiguation)